The year 2004 is the first year in the history of the Konfrontacja Sztuk Walki, a mixed martial arts promotion based in Poland. In 2004 Konfrontacja Sztuk Walki held 2 events beginning with, KSW I: Konfrontacja.

List of events

KSW I: Konfrontacja

'KSW I: Konfrontacja' was a mixed martial arts event held on February 27, 2004 at the Hotel Marriott in Warsaw, Poland .

Results

KSW 1 Tournament Bracket

KSW II: Konfrontacja

 
KSW II: Konfrontacja was a mixed martial arts event held on October 7, 2004 at the Hotel Marriott in Warsaw, Poland.

Results

See also 
 Konfrontacja Sztuk Walki

References

Konfrontacja Sztuk Walki events
2004 in mixed martial arts